Placer Parkway is a 15-mile proposed highway that would connect Highway 65 just south of Lincoln, California and north of Rocklin to Highway 99 near the Sacramento International Airport. The highway would traverse through portions of Sacramento County, Sutter County, and Placer County in primarily agricultural land. It is expected to be an alternate route for Interstate 80, in hopes of easing traffic on the latter.

The first phase of the project, an environmental study, was unanimously approved by the Placer County Board of Supervisors in 2015.

See also
Capital SouthEast Connector

References

External links
 Placer County Transportation Planning Agency - Placer Parkway Corridor Preservation Project

Named highways in California
Transportation in Sacramento County, California
Transportation in Placer County, California
Proposed state highways in the United States